Vilar de Maçada is a freguesia (civil parish) of Alijó municipality, in northern Portugal. The population in 2011 was 915, in an area of 20.19 km2. The locality is known as the place where José Sócrates, former Portuguese Prime-Minister born in the city of Porto in 1957, was registered in that same year by his father.

References

Freguesias of Alijó